Chintalapadu may refer to:
Chintalapadu, Chandarlapadu mandal, a village in Chandarlapadu mandal of Krishna district, India
Chintalapadu, Tiruvuru mandal, a village in Tiruvuru mandal of Krishna district, India